This article appears to be about something which has relevance to happenings in some unspecified country. It should be more explanatory (Sweden perhaps?). 

Körslaget 2009 is the third season of TV4's entertainment show Körslaget. It premiered on 3 October. The show's host is the same as the other seasons'; Gry Forssell.

Competitors
Rodrigo Pencheff With a Choir From Rinkeby
Caroline af Ugglas With a Choir From Upplands-Bro
Stefan Nykvist With a Choir From Älvdalen
Ola Svensson With a Choir From Lund
Andreas Lundstedt With a Choir From Uppsala
Amy Diamond With a Choir From Jönköping
Roger Pontare With a Choir From Lycksele

Program 1
Aired 3 October 2009

 Team Andreas - Disco Inferno (The Trammps)
 Team Amy - Baby Goodbye (E.M.D.)
 Team Stefan - Jag ringer på fredag (Sven-Ingvars)
 Team Caroline - The Ketchup Song (Las Ketchup)
 Team Ola - Viva la Vida (Coldplay)
 Team Rigo - I Know You Want Me (Calle Ocho) (Pitbull)
 Team Pontare - Pride, In the Name of Love (U2)

Top 3

No choir was eliminated

Program 2
Aired 10 October 2009

 Team Pontare - Go West (Village People/Pet Shop Boys)
 Team Rigo - La Bamba (Ritchie Valens)
 Team Amy - Fairytale (Alexander Rybak)
 Team Ola - Theme from New York, New York (Frank Sinatra)
 Team Andreas - Poker Face (Lady Gaga)
 Team Caroline - 800 grader (Ebba Grön)
 Team Stefan - Inget stoppar oss nu (Black Jack)

Elimination
The Choir with the darkest shade of gray was eliminated.

Episode 3
Aired 17 October

 Team Stefan - Sweet Child o' Mine (Guns N' Roses)
 Team Caroline - Snälla, snälla (Caroline af Ugglas)
 Team Ola - Natalie (Ola Svensson)
 Team Rigo - I Got U (Rigo and the Topaz sound feat. Red Fox)
 Team Pontare - När vindarna viskar mitt namn (Roger Pontare)
 Team Amy - Thank You (Amy Diamond)

Elimination
The Choir with the darkest shade of gray was eliminated.

Episode 4
Aired 24 October

Round 1
 Team Amy - Thank You (Katrina and the Waves)
 Team Stefan - Gråt inga tårar (Thorleifs)
 Team Ola - Angels (Robbie Williams)
 Team Caroline - Should I Stay or Should I Go (The Clash)
 Team Pontare - I get around (The Beach Boys)

Round 2
 Team Amy - Money money (ABBA)
 Team Stefan - Hooked on a feeling (Björn Skifs)
 Team Ola - It's raining men (The Weather Girls)
 Team Caroline - Don't worry be happy (Bobby McFerrin)
 Team Pontare - We will rock you (Queen)

Elimination
The Choir with the darkest shade of gray was eliminated.

Episode 5
Aired 31 October

Round 1
 Team Pontare - Hot, hot, hot (Buster Poindexter/The Cure)
 Team Stefan - Du är min man (Helen Sjöholm)
 Team Amy - Higher and higher (Jackie Wilson)
 Team Ola - As long as you love me (Backstreet Boys)

Round 2
 Team Pontare - Take My Breath Away (Top Gun)
 Team Stefan - You never can tell (Pulp Fiction)
 Team Amy - What a Feeling (Flashdance)
 Team Ola - Lady Marmalade (Moulin Rouge)

Elimination
The Choir with the darkest shade of gray was eliminated.

Episode 6
Aired 7 November

Round 1
 Team Stefan - Det börjar verka kärlek, banne mig (Claes-Göran Hederström)
 Team Ola - When you say nothing at all (Ronan Keating)
 Team Pontare - Uptown girl (Billy Joel/Westlife)

Round 2
 Team Stefan - Enter sandman (Metallica)
 Team Ola - Leende guldbruna ögon (Vikingarna)
 Team Pontare - I kissed a girl (Katy Perry)

Elimination
The Choir with the darkest shade of gray was eliminated.

Program 7 - The Finale
Aired 14 November

Team Stefan:
 Eloise (Arvingarna)
 Enter sandman (Metallica)
 Caruso (Pavarotti/Paul Potts)

Team Ola:
 All by myself  (Celine Dion)
 It's raining men (The Weather Girls)
 Caruso (Pavarotti/Paul Potts)

Duel:
 Bumble Bee

Final Results
The Choir in green were declared the winners

Elimination chart

TV4 (Sweden) original programming
2009 Swedish television seasons